Death of True Spirit is the second of two compilation albums released by Indecision Records featuring material by Californian hardcore punk band, Unbroken. It is made up of 1993's Ritual, and 1994's Life. Love. Regret. albums. Indecision released it in August 2003.

Track listing
"D4" – 3:01
"End of a Life Time" – 2:59
"In the Name of Progression" – 4:36
"Razor" – 2:47
"Final Expression" – 3:17
"Blanket" – 2:30
"Recluse" – 3:31
"Setup" – 4:04
"Curtain" – 8:59
"Zero Hour" – 3:45
"Shallow" – 4:11
"Unheard" – 2:53
"My Time" – 2:50
"Break Me Own" – 2:48
"Reflection" – 3:36 
"Remain" – 3:13
"Cold Front" – 2:29
 Tracks 1 – 9 from Life. Love. Regret. (1994) 	
 Tracks 10 – 17 from Ritual (1993)

Credits
 David Claibourn – vocals
 Steve Miller – guitar
 Eric Allen – guitar
 Rob Moran – bass
 Todd Beattie – drums
 Recorded 1993 (Ritual) and 1994 (Life. Love. Regret.)
 Produced by Unbroken
 Engineered by Jeff Forrest

References

External links
 Indecision Records band page
 [ Allmusic Guide album entry]

2003 compilation albums
Unbroken (band) albums
Indecision Records compilation albums